James Dixon (1814–1873) was a U.S. Representative from Connecticut.

James, Jamie, Jim  or Jimmy Dixon may also refer to:

People
James Dixon (priest) (1758–1840), Irish-Australian Catholic priest
James Dixon (American football) (born 1967), American football wide receiver
James Dixon (conductor) (1929–2007), American conductor
James Budd Dixon (1900–1967), American painter and printmaker
James Main Dixon (1856–1933), American teacher and author
James R. Dixon (1928–2015), American biologist
James Stedman Dixon (1845–1911), Scottish coal-mine owner
James Dixon (Lancashire cricketer), English cricketer
James Dixon (Police Officer) (died 2017), British Police Officer
Jamie Dixon (born 1965), college basketball coach
Jim Dixon (American football) (1904–1966), American football player, wrestler and coach
Jimmy Dixon (born 1981), Liberian footballer
Jimmy Dixon (politician) (born 1945), North Carolina House of Representatives member

Characters
Jim Dixon, the eponymous central character of Lucky Jim, 1954 novel by Kingsley Amis

Other
James S. Dixon Trophy in Canadian football

See also
James Dixon Murray (1887–1965), British coal miner and politician
James Dixon Black (1849–1938), Kentucky governor
James Dixon Roman (1809–1867), American politician
James Dixon Williams (1877–1934), American film producer
James Dickson (disambiguation)